Tateishi Fourth File Rook (立石流四間飛車 tateishi-ryū shikenbisha) is a Fourth File Rook strategy that incorporates characteristics of the Ishida (a variation of Third File Rook) opening.

It was named after an amateur player named Tateishi 立石. However, the opening has been used by professional players as well as amateurs. Tateishi received the Special Kōzō Masuda Award in 2004 as a recognition to its development. 

Starting from Black's turn, the rook will move to R-68, hence making a Fourth File Rook formation, and then push the vanguard pawn with P-75, and then P-65. From there the rook can move to R-66 and then R-76, so in the end it often settles into an Ishida opening.

From the opening, the major pieces (rook and bishop) can move a lot, but since the bishops can be exchanged  at any point, with such a formation the side playing Ishida will end up with golds and silvers being separated. Nevertheless, since often the golds and silvers in the Static Rook side's formation would lean towards one side (particularly when aiming at Static Rook Anaguma), the other side can aim for a rook exchange on the Static Rook's unprepared gaps.

This opening attracted attention as a countermeasure for Static Rook Anaguma, and was played by many Ranging Rook professional players. In particular, shogi player Kenji Kobayashi researched the system as combined with his own "Super Fourth File Rook," in which came to be called "Super Tateishi," and which allowed him to win the Speed Shogi Tournament of 1994.

As a result of the developments in Static Rook countermeasures like moving a gold on the first rank, the Tateishi opening has become progressively rare among professional players.

Development

References

Bibliography

External links

 Shogi.Net's Quest of the Lost Systems: Chapter Two Furibisha: Section 5 Masuda-shiki Ishida-ryu · translation of 消えた戦法の謎 by Kiyokazu Katsumata (勝又清和)

Shogi openings
Ranging Rook openings
Static Rook vs Ranging Rook openings
Fourth File Rook openings
Third File Rook openings